Eternal Enemies is the sixth studio album from Emmure, released on April 15, 2014. It is the final album to feature drummer Mark Castillo after his departure less than 3 months after the album's release. It is also the final album to feature Jesse Ketive, Mark Davis, and Mike Mulholland after their departure on December 22, 2015.

Background 
When the track listing for the album was released on February 18, 2014,<ref>{{cite web|url=http://altpress.com/news/entry/emmure_announce_new_album_eternal_enemies|title='Emmure announce new album 'Eternal Enemies|publisher=AltPress |date=2014-02-18 |accessdate=2014-02-19}}</ref> the name of the first track, "Bring a Gun to School", sparked controversy.  This resulted in their former guitarist Ben Lionetti making a statement with respect to his former ensemble and commenting on the track, calling lead vocalist Frankie Palmeri a "disgusting human being".  He reportedly considered filing legal action against Emmure, their record label and their management to retrieve the money that is due to him and his brother Joe, a former drummer of the band. The song title has been changed to simply "(Untitled)" in the iTunes store.

Critical reception

At Alternative Press'', Phil Freeman rated the album four stars out of five, remarking how the release is "Emmure's latest slab of relentless, skull-battering deathcore" and it "finds them in top form." Elsewhere, the album was heavily panned. At Sputnikmusic, Davey Boy remarked how the album was "so unsubtle and earnest" in its "targeting of rage-filled teenage males, through aggressive, hateful and misogynistic words." Tomas Doyle of Thrash Hits called lead vocalist Frankie Palmeri a "very angry man", and unfavorably compared the album's controversial intentions to the brilliance of controversial artists like Marilyn Manson and Eminem. He went further as to say the album was "so fatally lacking in musical spark."

Track listing 

 (*) = Title was later changed to "(Untitled)" on the album’s retail release.

Commercial performance
The album debuted at No. 57 on the Billboard 200 (No. 55 in the Top Current Albums), and at No. 4 in the Top Hard Rock Albums chart with 6,475 copies sold in its debut week in the U.S.

Personnel

Emmure
 Mark Castillo - drums
 Mark Davis - bass guitar
 Jesse Ketive - lead guitar
 Michael Mulholland - rhythm guitar
 Frankie Palmeri - vocals

Production
Mixed & mastered by Joey Sturgis @ The Foundation Recording Studios, Connersville, Indiana
Vocals recorded by Nick Scott & Allan Hessler @ Metro 37 Studios
Guitar & bass recorded by Nick Scott
Drums recorded by Joseph Hall
Publicity by Rachel Rosenberg
Booking by Amanda Fiore (The Pantheon Agency, US) & Marco Walzel (Avocado Booking, EU)
Art & layout by Randy Pfeil
Photo by Eric Richter & Dustin Smith

Charts

References 

2014 albums
Emmure albums
Obscenity controversies in music
Victory Records albums
Albums produced by Joey Sturgis